Ron Stewart is an American multi-instrumentalist in the bluegrass tradition. He plays fiddle, guitar, banjo, and mandolin, and has won the International Bluegrass Music Association (IBMA) award for Fiddle Player of the Year in 2000 and Banjo Player of the Year in 2011.

Biography

Early years
Ron Stewart was born on December 11, 1968, in Paoli, Indiana. Stewart began playing fiddle at age 3 and at age 9, Stewart made several guest appearances with Lester Flatt, and appeared on one of his live albums. From 1977 until 1990, Stewart ("Little Ronnie Stewart"), played in the Stewart Family Band with his parents.

Recording and performing career

Curly Seckler
Stewart began working with Curly Seckler in 1989, and recorded two albums with him: Tribute to Lester Flatt and Bluegrass Gospel.

Gary Brewer and the Kentucky Ramblers
From 1991 until 1994, Stewart was a member of Gary Brewer and the Kentucky Ramblers. Other members included Bill Colwell (mandolin) and Dale "Punch" Taylor (bass).

Lynn Morris Band
From 1997 until 2003, Stewart played banjo, guitar, and fiddle with the Lynn Morris band. The band included Morris (guitar, vocals, banjo), Marshall Wilborn (bass), Jesse Brock (mandoli, and Stewart.

Time Stands Still
In 2001, Stewart released Time Stands Still, his first solo album in 22 years. Lynn Morris produced, and guest artists included Dudley Connell (guitar), Sammy Shelor (banjo), Rob Ickes (resophonic guitar), and Marshall Wilborn (bass).

J. D. Crowe and the New South
In 2003, Stewart joined J. D. Crowe and the New South, which also included Rickey Wasson (guitar, vocals), Dwight McCall (mandolin, vocals), and Harold Nixon (bass).

Dan Tyminski Band
Stewart joined the Dan Tyminski Band in 2007 along with Adam Steffey (mandolin), Barry Bales (bass), and Justin Moses (resonator guitar).

Longview
2008, Stewart recorded and performed with Longview, along with Marshall Wilborn (bass), Don Rigsby (mandolin), James King (vocals), Lou Reid (guitar), and J. D. Crowe (banjo) for the album Deep In The Mountains.

The Boxcars
In 2009, Stewart formed the Boxcars with Adam Steffey (mandolin), John Bowman (guitar, fiddle, banjo), Keith Garrett (guitar, vocals), and Harold Nixon (bass).
2011 IBMA Emerging Artist and Instrumental Group of the Year.

The Seldom Scene
In 2017, the Boxcars disbanded, and Stewart joined the Seldom Scene, replacing Rickie Simpkins.

Awards
Stewart won the IBMA award for Fiddle Player of the Year in 2000 and the IBMA Award for Banjo Player of the Year in 2011.

Instruments
Warren Yates produces the Ron Stewart Signature Series Banjo, designed to look and sound like a 1933 banjo.

Stewart and his father Frank re-voice, restore, and repair acoustic stringed instruments, and they build violins under the name  F&R Stewart Violins.

Personal life
Stewart has a ranch called Sleepy Valley Ranch on which Stewart and his wife built a log house from trees on the ranch in 2000. Stewart also operates Sleepy Valley Barn, a recording studio.

Discography

Solo albums
 1979: Talkin' Fiddle Blues (Programme Audio) as Fiddlin' Ronnie Stewart
 1982: Walking In The Moonlight (Old Homestead) as Fiddlin' Ronnie Stewart and the Stewart Family
 2001: Time Stands Still (Rounder)

With Curly Seckler with Willis Spears
 1989: Tribute to Lester Flatt (Rebel)
 1989: Bluegrass Gospel (Rich-R-Tone)

With Gary Brewer
 1996: Guitar (Copper Creek)
 1996: Nearing Jordan's Crossing (Copper Creek)

The Lynn Morris Band
 1999: You'll Never Be the Sun (Rounder)
 2003: Shape of a Tear (Rounder)

With J. D. Crowe and the New South
 2007: Lefty's Old Guitar (Rounder)

With Longview
 2008: Deep in the Mountains (Rounder)

With the Boxcars
 2010: The Boxcars (Mountain Home)
 2012: All In (Mountain Home)
 2013: It’s Just a Road (Mountain Home)
 2016: Familiar With The Ground (Mountain Home)

As producer
 2004: John Lawless - Five & Dime (Copper Creek)
 2004: Jeff Parker - Two Roads to Travel (Lonesome Day)
 2005: Darrell Webb - Behind the Scenes (Lonesome Day)
 2007: Tommy Webb - Eastern Kentucky (Kindred)
 2008: Rickey Wasson - From the Heart and Soul (Rural Rhythm)
 2009: Tommy Webb - Heartland (Rural Rhythm)

Also appears on
1985 - 2001 
 1985: Tony Trischka - Hill Country (Rounder)
 1997: Chris Jones - No One But You (Rebel)
 1998: Hazel Dickens - Heart of a Singer (Rounder)
 1999: Chris Jones - Follow Your Heart (Rebel)
 1999: Marshall Wilborn - Root 5: Bass and Banjo (Pinecastle)
 2000: Front Range - Silent Ground (Sugar Hill)
 2000: Chris Jones - Just A Drifter (Rebel)
 2000: Don Rigsby - Empty Old Mailbox (Sugar Hill)
 2000: Herschel Sizemore - My Style (Hay Holler)
 2000: Dan Tyminski - Carry Me Across the Mountain (Doobie Shea)
 2000: Rhonda Vincent - Back Home Again (Rounder)
 2001: Audie Blaylock - Trains Are the Only Way to Fly (self-released)
 2001: Dale Ann Bradley - Cumberland River Dreams (Doobie Shea)
 2001: Mike Burns - Walk the Water's Edge (North Co Music)
 2001: Sally Jones - Love Hurts (self-released)
 2001: Kathy Kallick - My Mother's Voice (Copper Creek)
 2001: Adam Steffey - Grateful (Mountain Home)
 2001: Ginny Hawker - Letters From My Father (Rounder)
 2001: Rhonda Vincent - The Storm Still Rages (Rounder)

2002 - 2004 
 2002: Chris Jones - Few Words (Rebel)
 2002: The Special Consensus - Route 10 (Pinecastle)
 2002: Ernie Thacker - Chill of Lonesome (Doobie Shea)
 2002: Josh Williams - Now That You're Gone (Pinecastle)
 2002: Baucom, Bibey and BlueRidge - Come Along with Me (Sugar Hill)
 2002: Ronnie Bowman - Starting Over (Sugar Hill)
 2002: Jesse Brock - Kickin' Grass (Pinecastle)
 2002: Special Consensus - Route 10 (Pinecastle)
 2003: Wayne Benson - An Instrumental Anthology (Pinecastle)
 2003: Jeannie Kendall - Jeannie Kendall (Rounder)
 2003: Larry Stephenson Band - Clinch Mountain Mystery (Pinecastle)
 2003: Jimmy Sturr - Let's Polka 'Round (Rounder)
 2004: Ginny Hawker and Tracy Schwarz - Draw Closer (Rounder)
 2004: Josh Williams - Lonesome Highway (Pinecastle)

2005 - 2009
 2005: Clay Jones - Mountain Tradition (Rural Rhythm)
 2005: Blue Moon Rising - On the Rise (Lonesome Day)
 2005: Lou Reid - Time (Lonesome Day)
 2005: Jordan Tice - No Place Better (Patuxent Music)
 2006: New River Line - Chasing My Dreams (Kindred)
 2006: Bradley Walker - Highway of Dreams (Rounder)
 2006: Jim VanCleve - No Apologies (Rural Rhythm)
 2007: Steve Gulley - Sounds Like Home (Lonesome Day)
 2007: Donna Hughes - Gaining Wisdom (Rounder)
 2007: Dwight Mccall - Never Say Never Again (Rural Rhythm)
 2007: Larry Sparks - The Last Suit You Wear (McCoury Music)
 2007: Tony Trischka - Double Banjo Bluegrass Spectacular (Rounder)
 2008: Blue Moon Rising - One Lonely Shadow (Lonesome Day)
 2008: David Parmley and Continental Divide - Three Silver Dollars 2008: Kenny and Amanda Smith - Live And Learn (Rebel)
 2008: Dan Tyminski - Wheels (Rounder)
 2008: Rhonda Vincent - Good Thing Going (Rounder)
 2009: Lou Reid and Carolina - My Own Set of Rules (Rural Rhythm)
 2009: Adam Steffey - One More for the Road (Sugar Hill)

2010 - present
 2010: J. D. Crowe, Doyle Lawson, and Paul Williams - Old Friends Get Together (Mountain Home)
 2010: Steve Gulley and Tim Stafford - Dogwood Winter (Rural Rhythm)
 2010: Brand New Strings - No Strings Attached (Rural Rhythm)
 2010: Lou Reid and Carolina - Sounds Like Heaven To Me (Rural Rhythm)
 2011: Sierra Hull - Daybreak (Rounder)
 2011: Charlie Sizemore - Heartache Looking for a Home (Rounder)
 2011: Larry Sparks - Almost Home (Rounder)
 2012: American Drive - American Drive (Rural Rhythm)
 2012: Richard Bennett - Last Train from Poor Valley's (Lonesome Day)
 2012: Carrie Hassler - Distance (Rural Rhythm)
 2012: Lou Reid and Carolina - Callin' Me Back Home (Kama)
 2012: Kenny and Amanda Smith - Catch Me If I Try (Farm Boy)
 2012: The Spinney Brothers - Memories (Mountain Fever)
 2013: James King - Three Chords and the Truth (Rounder)
 2013: Nu-Blu - Ten (Rural Rhythm)
 2013: The Spinney Brothers - No Borders (Mountain Fever)
 2014: Richard Bennett - In the Wind Somewhere (Lonesome Day)
 2014: Steve Gulley - Family, Friends & Fellowship (Rural Rhythm)
 2014: Nu-Blu - All the Way (Rural Rhythm)
 2015: John Bowman - Beautiful Ashes (Mountain Home)
 2016: Rickey Wasson - Croweology - The Study of J.D. Crowe's Musical Legacy (Truegrass)

Music instruction
 2010 Ron Stewart: A Bluegrass Banjo Professional DVD (Mel Bay)
 2011: Ron Stewart: The Fiddlers of Flatt and Scruggs DVD (AcuTab)
 2011: Ron Stewart: Playing Fiddle in the Bluegrass Style DVD (AcuTab)

References

External links 
 
 
 
 

1968 births
American bluegrass musicians
American country guitarists
American male guitarists
American country singer-songwriters
American fiddlers
American folk musicians
Living people
American mandolinists
American bluegrass mandolinists
Guitarists from Indiana
20th-century American guitarists
Country musicians from Indiana
21st-century American violinists
20th-century American male musicians
21st-century American male musicians
New South (band) members
Longview (American band) members
The Seldom Scene members
American male singer-songwriters
Singer-songwriters from Indiana